Superstock, Super Stock or Superstocks may refer to:

 European Superstock 1000 Championship, defunct motorcycle racing series
 Superstock TT, motorcycle race at the Isle of Man TT
 Super Stock, a category of drag racing
 Superstocks, New Zealand dirt track car racing category
 The Super Stocks, American surf music band
 Superstox, British short oval car racing category